Jing'an District is one of the central districts of Shanghai.

The district borders the Hongkou District to the east, Huangpu District to the east and south, Putuo District to the west, Baoshan District to the north and Changning District to the west.

On 4 November 2015 Zhabei District merged with Jing'an District, bringing Shanghai down to 15 districts and one county.

Jing'an District is named after Jing'an Temple, an ancient traditional Chinese Buddhist temple. Today's temple is a new replica of the old one, located in the southern part of the district. An Art Deco "dancehall" is just across the street; the neighborhood is largely residential, but with many bars and restaurants. Jing'an Park, located opposite the temple, is popular among locals; it used to be a graveyard for foreigners in the old Shanghai.

Historically, the northern part of the district, what used to be Zhabei, has been highly populated with working class residents. However, due to the shift in the structure of industries and increasing number of immigrants from outside Shanghai, partly due to its reasonable real estate prices (compared to its counterparts such as Putuo and Hongkou), the district has become increasingly appealing to city residents.

Economy and facilities

Development in the southern part of the district has been rapid. In three years the stock of Grade A office space in the southern part of the district increased approximately 320 percent, from a total of just 333,000 sqm in 2007 to 1,067,000 sqm in 2010. West Nanjing Road is one of Shanghai's premier shopping districts and is home to five-star hotels and exhibition centers as well as several upscale housing complexes. Key landmarks on West Nanjing Road include the Shanghai Exhibition Centre and the Shanghai Centre.

The southern part of the district is one of Shanghai's key central business and commercial districts.  It contains numerous large office buildings, hotels, and many shopping venues at the street level.  The district comprises a prominent portion of the Shanghai skyline.  The district is also known for having many high-rise residential buildings.

The northern part of the district used to be the place of agglomeration of traditional industries such as flavorings factories and tires factories. In the last decade the municipality decided to move the old industry out to make space for more promising ones, such as the hi-tech and creative industries. It has attracted foreign companies to build offices, apartments and commercial retail outlets over there.

Jing'An District is also where the Shanghai Multimedia Valley (SMV) is located to attract media and IT talent. Major companies located in Zhabei include TÜV Rheinland, Royal Philips Electronics and Shanghai Bell Alcatel Business Systems Co., LTD.

China Resources Beverage, the distributor of C'estbon water, has its east China regional office on the twentieth floor of the Huanzhi International Building (环智国际大厦) in the district.

Daning Lingshi Park, the biggest green area in the downtown area, is surrounded by a series of cultural facilities such as the Zhabei Stadium and Shanghai Circus World.

The Shanghai University, Yanchang Campus is also located near the Daning Lingshi Park.

Education 
Universities & Colleges

 Shanghai University, Yanchang Campus
 Shanghai Theatre Academy, Huahan Road Campus

High School

 Shanghai Shixi High School (SSHS)
 Qiyi High School Affiliated to Tongji University

Primary School

 First Central Primary School of Jing'an District

Chinese Language Institutes

 Silk Mandarin

English Teaching Schools

 EF Education First, headquarters

Subdistricts and towns

Transportation

Metro
Jing'an is currently served by nine metro lines operated by Shanghai Metro:

 - Hanzhong Road, Shanghai Railway Station , North Zhongshan Road, Yanchang Road, Shanghai Circus World, Wenshui Road, Pengpu Xincun, Gongkang Road
 - Jing'an Temple , West Nanjing Road
 and  - Shanghai Railway Station , Baoshan Road
 - Changping Road Station, Jing'an Temple 
 - North Xizang Road, Zhongxing Road, Qufu Road 
 - Tiantong Road 
 - Hanzhong Road  , West Nanjing Road  , Qufu Road , Tiantong Road 
 - Hanzhong Road  , Natural History Museum, West Nanjing Road  
 - Wuding Road, Jing'an Temple

See also

 Jing'an Sculpture Park

References

Further reading

External links

Jing'an District website 
Jing'an District website (English version)
 
 Shanghai Zhabei Government Portal 
 Shanghai Circus World 

 
Districts of Shanghai